The N65 road is a national secondary road in Ireland. It links the N52 at Borrisokane, County Tipperary to the M6 north of Loughrea in County Galway. 

En route it crosses the Portumna bridge over the River Shannon.

See also
Roads in Ireland 
Motorways in Ireland
National primary road
Regional road

References
Roads Act 1993 (Classification of National Roads) Order 2006 – Department of Transport

National secondary roads in the Republic of Ireland
Roads in County Galway
Roads in County Tipperary
Borrisokane